RDS Stadium (formerly Mazda Palace and Vaillant Palace) is an indoor sporting arena located in Genoa, Italy.  The capacity of the arena is 5,500 people.  It hosts concerts and indoor sporting events.

External links

Indoor arenas in Italy
Buildings and structures in Genoa
Sport in Genoa